United States v. White, 401 U.S. 745 (1971), was a United States Supreme Court decision which held that recording conversations using concealed radio transmitters worn by informants does not violate the Fourth Amendment protection against unreasonable searches and seizures, and thus does not require a warrant.

Facts and Procedural History
Criminal defendant White was convicted of narcotics charges in the United States District Court for the Northern District of Illinois, Eastern Division.  The conviction was based on evidence obtained from recorded conversations in 1965 and 1966 between the defendant White and a government informant wearing a concealed radio transmitter.  White appealed the conviction, claiming the conversations were recorded without his permission, that he had a reasonable expectation of privacy (see Katz), and the conversations were recorded without a warrant, violating his Fourth Amendment protection against unreasonable searches and seizures.  Thus, White argued that the recorded conversations should not have been admitted as evidence.  The United States Court of Appeals for the Seventh Circuit, 405 F.2d 838, reversed the district court and remanded, and certiorari was granted.

Decision and Rationale
The Supreme Court reversed the decision of the Seventh Circuit Court of Appeals with a four-vote plurality, arguing that the use of government agents to reveal conversations does not violate the Fourth Amendment.  The court stated that a defendant's expectation that his colleague will not reveal incriminating information to the police is not protected under the Constitution. Furthermore, since a police informant may write down records of conversations with a defendant and admit them into evidence without a warrant, electronically recorded conversations should not be treated any differently under the constitution. So long as the police informant's actions are considered to be reasonable investigative efforts, the officer's records are lawful and admissible evidence, despite a lack of a warrant.

The plurality opinion also found that it was an error for the Court of Appeals to apply the reasoning of Katz v. United States, which held that wiretapping a public phone booth required a search warrant, since the Katz decision from 1967 did not retroactively apply to conversations recorded between 1965-1966.

Dissenting Opinion
Justice Douglas dissented, stating: "Electronic Surveillance is the greatest leveler of human privacy ever known. The concepts of privacy which the Founders enshrined in the Fourth Amendment vanish completely when we slavishly allow an all powerful government, proclaiming law and order, efficiency, and other benign purposes, to penetrate all the walls and doors which men need to shield them from the pressures of a turbulent life around them and give them the health and strength to carry on. Today no one perhaps notices because only a small obscure criminal is the victim. But every person is the victim, for the technology we exalt today is everyone's master." He goes on to warn: "I would stand by Katz and reaffirm the need for judicial supervision under the Fourth Amendment of the use of electronic surveillance which, uncontrolled, promises to lead us into a police state."

Justice Harlan dissented separately, noting that "the uncontrolled consensual surveillance in an electronic age is a tolerable technique of law enforcement given the values and goals of our political system." However, he added that this tolerance should be balanced against the utility as a technique of law enforcement "to the extent of its likely impact on individual’s sense of security." Alluding to "the Orwellian Big Brother," he wrote that warrantless "electronic monitoring, subject only to the self-restraint of law enforcement officials, has no place in our society," and dissented on the grounds that the risks of the electronic listener or observer should not be imposed on citizens "without at least the protection of a warrant requirement."

Justice Marshall also dissented separately, arguing that the Court's plurality opinion takes a giant step backward in that it precludes lower courts from resolving wholly disparate controversies, in the light of constitutional principles, in ways best suited to their individual jurisdictions, even going so far as to remind the majority that the Supreme Court is not the only tribunal in the entire federal system:

See also
List of United States Supreme Court cases, volume 401
Katz v. United States,

References

External links 
 

1971 in United States case law
Privacy case law
United States criminal investigation case law
United States evidence case law
United States Fourth Amendment case law
Fourth
United States Supreme Court cases of the Burger Court
United States Supreme Court cases
United States Third-Party Doctrine